= Gift of Happiness Foundation =

- Founded: 2005; 21 years ago
- Founder: Edward Haworth
- Location: Bangkok, Thailand
- Region served: South-East Asia
- Key people: Edward Haworth (Operations Director)
- Employees: 4
- Website: gohappiness.org

The Gift of Happiness Foundation (GOHF) is a charity under the royal patronage of His Majesty King Bhumibol Adulyadej of Thailand that's dedicated to helping poor children in Bangkok and throughout Thailand. The Gift of Happiness Foundation is a Registered Charity in the Kingdom of Thailand (Registration number: Kor Tor 1914)

== Objective ==
The Gift of Happiness Foundation serves happiness through giving simple slapstick comedy shows and donations to people who may have experienced negative, abusive or unhappy situations. Positive experiences and memories, like a good old-fashioned laugh, help children cope in difficult circumstances. The Gift of Happiness Foundation also aims to distribute a wide range of donations at orphanages, crisis centers for abused women and children, Bangkok slums, refugee camps along the Thai/Burmese border, HIV/AIDS centers, and homes and schools for physically & mentally challenged children.

== Donations ==
The Gift of Happiness Foundation is funded purely by donations. Donations have been collect from several organisations in Bangkok, including The St Georges Society, The Anglo-Thai Society

== Video clips ==
- Gift of Happiness YouTube channel
